In the early hours of 14 March 2017, a Sikorsky S-92 helicopter operated by CHC Helicopter under contract to the Irish Coast Guard (call sign Rescue 116) crashed into the sea while supporting a rescue operation off County Mayo, on Ireland's west coast. All four crew members on board, Captain Dara Fitzpatrick, Chief Pilot Mark Duffy, winch operator Paul Ormsby, and winch man Ciarán Smith were killed.

In a preliminary report published in April 2017, the Air Accident Investigation Unit found that the helicopter had clipped the small island of Blackrock at an altitude of around  while on approach to Blacksod Lighthouse for a refuelling stop, and subsequently crashed out of control into the sea.

Events
Shannon ATC last had communication from Rescue 116 at shortly before the crash announcing 'making our way to Blacksod for refuel'. Refuelling is a common practice in a long-range and lengthy SAR mission. The helicopter itself did not make any mayday call, but disappeared from air traffic control radar around 12:45am and failed to arrive at Blacksod, prompting the issuing of a declaration of emergency by the Marine Rescue Coordination Centre (MRCC) in Dublin.

Rescue 118 was advised of the situation and routed to Blacksod to begin a search for the missing helicopter. Rescue 115, the Shannon Airport-based Coast Guard helicopter, was immediately dispatched to the area to aid in the search, along with a CASA CN-235 maritime patrol aircraft from the Irish Air Corps. The Irish Naval Service offshore patrol vessel LÉ Róisín arrived in the search zone at 9:00 am on 14 March. Divers from the Naval Service Diving Section and Garda Water Unit and RNLI vessels were also sent to the scene. Investigators from the Air Accident Investigation Unit attended the scene on the same day. The Naval Service flagship LÉ Eithne joined the search effort that afternoon, and both Naval Service vessels continued the search throughout the night and into the next day.

Eithne was made on-scene coordinator of the recovery mission. The Marine Institute's RV Celtic Voyager was dispatched on the night of 14 March to search using multibeam echosounders to help locate the wreckage. The Commissioners of Irish Lights also sent the ILV Granuaile, an advanced multifunctional vessel, to the scene. The Marine Institute's work class ROV Holland one was mobilised onto the Granuaile in Galway harbour .

The vessel is equipped with a dynamic positioning system which allows it to operate in difficult sea conditions, cranes capable of hoisting recovered wreckage and a helicopter platform. The Geological Survey of Ireland surveyed the underwater region and carried out detailed mapping where the search was focused on to aid diving teams in the recovery of the wreckage. The Navy's LÉ Samuel Beckett later joined the recovery efforts and assumed command as the on-scene coordinator.

On the afternoon of 15 March, a signal transmitting from the helicopter's flight recorder had been received by a team from the Irish Marine Institute using USBL equipment from a local fishing vessel. On 16 March, AAIU investigators were airlifted onto the helipad at Blackrock lighthouse, where a significant section of wreckage from Rescue 116 was found on the high rocky island. From the examination of this tail section AAIU investigators believe that the tail of the helicopter made contact with the western slopes of Blackrock. The preliminary report by AAIU investigators found that the helicopter had hit the island, which was registered in the craft's GPS mapping system but not on EGPWS. (EGPWS) is a legacy capable Class A terrain awareness and warning system (TAWS) designed for digitally equipped aircraft.

Intense SAR operations continued on Saint Patrick's Day on 17 March.

Captain Dara Fitzpatrick's funeral took place on 18 March in Glencullen, County Dublin. Poor weather conditions continued to impede the search.

Air Corps resourcing issues
In search and rescue opearations, top cover is when a second aircraft is used to relay communications between a rescue aircraft far from land and its co-ordination centre on the shore. In the Service Level Agreement (SLA) between the Department of Defence and the Department of Transport, Tourism and Sport, the "provision and tasking of Air Corps assets [is] on an 'as available' basis". The Air Corps denied the request because of a staff shortage in experienced and trained personnel, which made it unable to operate an "out-of-hours" roster. This meant Rescue 116 was deployed instead to provide top cover. Following the Blacksod incident, an Irish Times report highlighted how resourcing issues delayed the Air Corps involvement in the rescue, and highlighted that Air Corps' CASA maritime patrol fixed-wing aircraft have advantages over CHC operated helicopters in top-cover situations, in that they can arrive "twice as fast" and "remain circling in its higher vantage point for up to nine hours".

At 1:45 am, an hour after last contact from Rescue 116, the Coast Guard made an emergency request for assistance to the Air Corps to help search for the missing SAR helicopter. The Air Corps activated its recall plan and 3 hours and 45 minutes after the Coast Guard's initial request for top cover, a CASA CN-235 maritime patrol aircraft was airborne.

The Defence Forces said that in 2017 three requests for top cover had to be refused due to reduced availability. Taoiseach (Prime Minister) Enda Kenny, who was also Minister for Defence, said that it was "well known" that the Air Corps had lost a number of personnel such as pilots and air traffic controllers in recent years. Minister with responsibility for Defence Paul Kehoe said that reduction in the capacity of the Air Corps was notified in summer 2016 to agencies and that the Department of Defence had made other arrangements in that regard.

Since the crash took place, there have remained safety concerns for search and rescue helicopter services in Ireland, with problems including cartographic errors and omissions, problems with the navigational software, inadequate life jackets and a lack of oversight of the Search and Rescue service.

Wreckage recovery and search for the missing
 
On 22 March, the wreckage from R116 was found by the Marine Institute Holland 1 ROV after signals from the flight data recorder pinger were received as well as some items of wreckage on Blackrock. There were hopes that the bodies of the missing crew members could be found in the wreckage.

On 24 March, Naval Service divers recovered the flight recorder from the wreckage on the sea bed on the eastern side of Blackrock, at a depth of 40 metres. Air Accident Investigation Unit chief inspector Jurgen Whyte confirmed that the black box was "visually in good condition" and would be flown under escort to the UK Air Accidents Investigation Branch for the data to be downloaded. Later on the same day Naval divers discovered the body of one of the three missing crew members in the cockpit section of the wreckage. On 26 March the body of the crew member was retrieved from the wreckage by NSDS divers and identified as that of co-pilot Captain Mark Duffy.

On 30 March, the funeral took place of Captain Duffy in County Louth.

Throughout the recovery attempts weather and sea conditions have forced diving to be suspended for long periods for safety reasons.  The large sea surface and underwater swells and currents around Blackrock Island have been making it dangerous for divers to operate and decompress safely from the 40m depths at which the wreckage lies.  In tandem with wreckage salvage there were extensive aerial, sea and coastline searches.

On 1 April, The AAIU announced no mechanical anomalies were identified from initial data from the recorders and therefore no additional safety actions would be required on similar helicopter types.  The AAIU also stated they intended to make a preliminary report in the near future.  A superintendent from Belmullet Gardaí said that the wreckage recovery of a section of the wreckage should take a matter of hours once suitable conditions arose to enable a safe lift.

On the evening of 2 April, the main bulk of the helicopter was raised from the sea and placed aboard the Irish Lights vessel Granuaile. After the lifting of the wreckage, it was confirmed that there was still no sighting of either winch operator Paul Ormsby or winch man Ciáran Smith. The search for the missing crew members continues.

On 3 April, the Irish Coastguard indicated to the families of the missing crewmen not to give up hope as they would continue searching for the missing crewmen.  At the suggestion of local fisherman the families of the missing crewman also appealed for fishermen and seafarers in Donegal and elsewhere where wreckage debris had been found or was likely to join in the search as their local knowledge would be invaluable.

 On the weekend of 8 April 2017 over 110 fishing vessels joined RNLI lifeboats, Irish Coast Guard and others in a co-ordinated sweep of over 8,500 square kilometres from Blacksod to Donegal in one of the largest sea searches in Irish maritime history.  As the missing were not located the next phase would be targeted searches and vigilance of special areas of interest.

Tributes 
The Rescue 116 helicopter with the same four crew members involved in the crash was present in Series 3 Episode 1 of the Irish TV show Paramedics, after being called in to assist in the extraction of a teenage boy with a dislocated patella within a remote field, three weeks before the fatal Rescue 116 crash. Rescue 116 was unable to land in the field due to electrical cables and livestock which would have made it unsafe to land, and so, Rescue 116 was forced to return to its base. A tribute was made by the paramedics involved in the rescue of the teenage boy within the episode.

Final report and inquests
The Air Accident Investigation Unit circulated a 333 page draft version of the final report into the crash in November 2019. The report was delayed, prompting a review - the first in the 25 year history of the AAIU. The final report was published on 5 November 2021.

On 2 June 2022 the jury at the inquests into the deaths delivered a verdict of accidental death.

References

External links
 Final Report of the AAIU

2017 in Ireland
Accidents and incidents involving the Sikorsky S-92
Aviation accidents and incidents involving controlled flight into terrain
Aviation accidents and incidents in 2017
Aviation accidents and incidents in Ireland
March 2017 events in Ireland
2017 disasters in Ireland